Robin Sachs (5 February 1951 – 1 February 2013) was an English actor, active in the theatre, television and films. He was also known for his voice-over work in films and video games.

Born to a theatrical family, Sachs studied at the Royal Academy of Dramatic Art in London, and made a theatrical and screen career, working his way up from supporting parts in the 1970s to leading roles from the 1980s. He made his later career in America, and became known for his role of Ethan Rayne in the television series Buffy the Vampire Slayer.

Early life and early career
Sachs was born in London, the elder of two sons of the South African-born actor Leonard Sachs and the English actress Eleanor Summerfield. His father was Jewish. After leaving school he studied at the Royal Academy of Dramatic Art, after which he followed the traditional route of provincial repertory and touring before being cast in supporting roles in West End productions during the 1970s, including Pirandello's Henry IV, with Rex Harrison; Pericles, with Derek Jacobi, and Pinero's The Gay Lord Quex, with Judi Dench, directed by John Gielgud.

Career
He appeared in leading stage roles, in Leicester in 1979 in Sartre's The Assassin, Brighton in 1984 in Love Affair with Siân Phillips, and at the Ashcroft Theatre, Croydon in 1985 in On Approval with Polly James and Christopher Biggins, On British television he was cast in Brideshead Revisited, Upstairs, Downstairs, Rumpole of the Bailey, Quiller and Gentlemen and Players. In the 1983 series Chessgame he played the secret agent Hugh Roskill.

Sachs's first film role was as Heinrich, a young vampire, in Hammer's Vampire Circus (1972). He played Thomas Culpepper, Catherine Howard's lover in Henry VIII and his Six Wives (1973), and featured in The Disappearance (1977) alongside Donald Sutherland.

In the early 1990s Sachs moved to Los Angeles after being cast as a guest star in the television series Jake and the Fatman and played Adam Carrington in the miniseries Dynasty: The Reunion. He remained based in the US, guest starring in television shows including The Return of Ironside with Raymond Burr (1993). Among his later films were Steven Spielberg's The Lost World: Jurassic Park (1997) and Steven Soderbergh's remake of Ocean's Eleven (2001). He appeared in several science-fiction programmes on television, including Star Trek and Torchwood, and in 1999 played General Sarris in the satirical comedy Galaxy Quest, co-starring Tim Allen and Sigourney Weaver. In 2002 he was cast as Peter Brazier, head of Nexexcon in Megalodon. In his last film appearance, Northfork (2002), he played Cup of Tea, the leader of the vestigial community of a town about to be flooded.

Sachs became known for his role as the sorcerer Ethan Rayne in the American television series Buffy the Vampire Slayer, and for voicing Zaeed Massani in the Mass Effect video game franchise, Admiral Saul Karath in Star Wars: Knights of the Old Republic, Sergeant Roderick in SpongeBob SquarePants and Xoloti in Majin and the Forsaken Kingdom. In recognition of his popularity as a voice artist, following his death, a Mass Effect 3 multiplayer challenge was enacted during the last weekend of February 2013, called "Operation Tribute".

Personal life and death
Sachs was twice married – from 1979 to 1991 to Siân Phillips, and from 1995 to 2006 to the American actress Casey DeFranco. Both marriages were dissolved. He died of a heart attack on 1 February 2013, four days before his 62nd birthday.

Filmography

Films

 Vampire Circus (1972) – Heinrich
 Henry VIII and His Six Wives (1972) – Thomas Culpeper
 East Lynne (1976, TV Movie) – Richard Hare
 The Disappearance (1977) – Young Man
 Richard II (1978, TV Movie) – Bushy
 A Flame to the Phoenix (1983) – Gavin McCrae
 Deadly Recruits (1986, TV Movie) – Hugh Roskill
 The Alamut Ambush (1986, TV Movie) – Hugh Roskill
 Cold War Killers (1986, TV Movie) – Hugh Roskill
 The Return of Ironside (1993, TV Movie) – Himself
 Innocent Adultery (1994) – Himself
 The Lost World: Jurassic Park (1997) – Paul Bowman
 Ravager (1997) – Dr Shepard
 Babylon 5: In the Beginning (1998, TV Series) – Coplann
 Galaxy Quest (1999) – Sarris
 Ocean's Eleven (2001) – Seller
 Megalodon (2004) – Peter Brazier
 Northfork (2003) – Cup of Tea
 Resident Evil: Damnation (2012) – Ataman / Ivan Judanovich (voice) (final film role)

Television series

 Love and Mr Lewisham (1972) – Mr Edwin Peake Baynes
 ITV Playhouse (1972) – Hugh Randolph
 Upstairs, Downstairs (1973) – Robert
 Ten from the Twenties (1975) – Harry Lance
 Quiller (1975) – Dieter
 Centre Play (1975) – Adam
 Crown Court (1976) – Himself
 Rob Roy (1977) – Frank Osbaldistone
 Ladykillers (1981) – Gervais Rentoul
 Brideshead Revisited (1981) - Oxford student.
 Diamonds (1983) – Charles Nielsen
 Tom, Dick and Harriet (1983) – Marcel
 Chessgame (1983) – Hugh Roskill
 C.A.T.S. Eyes (1985) – James Latchmere
 Rumpole of the Bailey (1987) – Hugo Lutterworth
 A Fine Romance (1989) – Count Ivan Rakosi
 Gentlemen and Players (1989) – Journalist
 The Bill (1991) – Prosecuting Counsel
 Jake and the Fatman (1991) – Greg Hatton
 Dynasty: The Reunion (1991) – Adam Carrington
 Herman's Head (1991) – Simon
 Box Office America (1992) – Himself – Host
 Murder, She Wrote (1993) – Martin Kramer
 Diagnosis: Murder (1994) – Art Thief
 Fantastic Four (1994) – Silver Surfer / Norrin Radd / Physician / Street Fanatic
 Walker, Texas Ranger (1995) – Philippe Brouchard
 Nowhere Man (1996) – Alexander Hale / The Voice
 Pacific Blue (1996) – Wilson Dupree
 Baywatch Nights (1996) – Malcolm O'Neal
 Nash Bridges (1996) – Yuri Vashkov
 F/X: The Series (1998) – Sebastian
 Babylon 5 (1994-1998) – Na'Tok / Warleader Na'Kal / Hedronn
 Buffy the Vampire Slayer (1997-2000) – Ethan Rayne
 Star Trek: Voyager (2001) – General Valen
 Alias (2005) – Hans Dietrich
 SpongeBob SquarePants (2006) – Sergeant Sam Roderick (voice)
 Torchwood (2011) – British Professor
 Castle (2012) – Announcer
 NCIS (2012) – MI5 Inspector Andrew Challis

Television miniseries
 Number 10 (1983) – Sir Edward Hamilton

Shorts
 An Unbending People (2011) – (voice)

Video games

 Star Wars: Knights of the Old Republic (2003) – Admiral Saul Karath (voice)
 Buffy the Vampire Slayer: Chaos Bleeds (2003) – Ethan Rayne / The First (voice)
 The Bard's Tale (2004) – (voice)
 GoldenEye: Rogue Agent (2004) – (voice)
 Tom Clancy's Rainbow Six: Lockdown (2005) – (voice)
 Dragon Age: Origins (2009) – Lord Pyral Harrowmont / Murdock / Experienced Human Male / Redcliffe Messenger / Landsmeet Noble / Bandit Leader / Howe Estate Guard / Denerim Soldier / Orzammar Grey Warden / Circle Tower Templar (voice)
 Mass Effect 2 (2010) – Zaeed Massani (voice)
 Dragon Age: Origins – Awakening (2010) – Seneschal Varel / Narrator / Statue of War (voice)
 Kane & Lynch 2: Dog Days (2010) – (voice)
 Majin and the Forsaken Kingdom (2010) – Xoloti (English version, voice)
 Mass Effect 3 (2012) – Zaeed Massani (voice)

Audiobooks
Sachs narrated some 80 audiobooks, both fiction and nonfiction. These included:

 The Tiger's Wife – Narration
 A World Undone – Narration
 Our Kind of Traitor – Narration
 The Snowman – Narration

 The Redbreast – Narration
 The Devil's Star – Narration

Documentary shorts
 Greece: Secrets of the Past – Pericles
 Ubuntu – Voice Over

Television documentary series
 The World of Hammer – Heinrich (archive audio)

References

External links
 

1951 births
2013 deaths
Alumni of RADA
English male film actors
English male television actors
English male video game actors
English male voice actors
English people of South African-Jewish descent
English expatriates in the United States
Male actors from London
British expatriate male actors in the United States
20th-century English male actors
21st-century English male actors